Thermodesulfobium acidiphilum is a moderately thermoacidophilic, Gram-negative, sulfate-reducing and obligately anaerobic bacterium from the genus of Thermodesulfobium which has been isolated from geothermally heated soil from Uzon Caldera in Russia.

References

External links
Type strain of Thermodesulfobium acidiphilum at BacDive -  the Bacterial Diversity Metadatabase

Thermoanaerobacterales
Bacteria described in 2017
Thermophiles
Anaerobes